This is a list of the main characters in the Croatian TV series Kud puklo da puklo.

Katarina Gavran

Katarina Gavran né Došen (portrayed by Mirna Medaković) is the girl from Zagreb, and she came to Oštrovac when her grandfather Đuro died.

Katarina is nice, smart, witty, stubborn, unruly and very passionate when she fights for her views. She finished medicine from a desire to help people, but after one year of work in the hospital it became clear that her work comes down to the numbers and not people, who are quite frustrating for her. She was in a long-time relationship with Dr Denis Osvaldić who cheated on her from time to time but she didn't know.

Through the 1st season, she broke up with him and started a relationship with Damir (episode 101). The two married at the end of the 1st season.

At the 2nd-season premiere, she and Damir opened the hotel "Đurin son", named after her grandfather.

Later on the season she and Damir try to have a baby, but the doctors told them that they are not compatible, so she and Damir adopted their son Roko. In the penultimate episode of series, she found out that she is pregnant with their child. In the last episode, she gave birth to daughter Đurđica (who was also named after Katarina's grandfather Đuro).

In same episode she said that without grandpa Đuro she would not be with Damir.

Damir Gavran

Damir Gavran (portrayed by Momčilo Otašević) is handsome, witty, sports slick and entertaining ranger in the national park in Oštrovac.

Damir was raised traditionally in a loving family, so that love and care for the family (and village) strongly embedded in him. He is like a good spirit of the village because like he takes care of the national like he takes care of the countryside. While his father is on board and has big plans for the village, Damir is a driver of any action (repair playground, patching holes in the roads, make-up school ...)

When his father tried to reopen sawmill, he was fired after the ministry shut down the park where he worked. He worked brief aboard. Some time later he returned to his job as a ranger, but in the second season he was set up by don Ante and he again got fired, but don Ante returned him later on the job.

He falls in love with Katarina from the first moment he saw her on the road when she hit him with a tin in the head. Until 63rd episode of a 1st season he constantly tried to hook up Katarina and in the 63rd episode, she kissed him and they spent the night in his log cabin. At the end of the 1st season, the couple married.

In 2nd season they opened a hotel. Later they try to make the baby, but the doctors said that they are not compatible and he and Katarina adopted son Roko and in a penultimate episode, he succeeded to make a baby with Katarina.

Mile Gavran

Mile is Damir's father. At the beginning of the series, he was president of the local board. His best friend is Stipe. His opponent is Sveto. Mile has wife Zdenka.

Stipe Žulj

Stipe is Mile's best friend. He is a widower. Stipe has a son named Ljubo. Stipe is retired cop. Stipe was in love with Ruža, Sveta's sister.

Ljubo Žulj

Ljubo is son of Stipe. He was a cop in Oštrovac until he is promoted to inspector in Zagreb. He left from Oštrovac throughout the first season. He returned to Oštrovac later in season when he was demoted. He was promoted again some time later season. He returned last time in Oštrovac on Damir's and Katarina's wedding day. He, Damir and Josip are best friends.

Josip Tepavac

Josip is best friend of Damir and Ljubo. He is married to Diana. His nickname is "Tesla", because he knows a lot to improve. He's father is Sveto.

Barbara Murgić

Barbara is a local teacher. She is Diana's mother. She was president of local board for a short time in first season.

Sveto Tepavac

Sveto is Mile's opponent. He is Josip's father. Sveto had a sister named Ruža, but she died in first season. Sveto became president of local board at the beginning of second season.

Krešimir Kolarić

He is Katarina's and Tomislav's cousin. He is second grandchild to Djura. People call him "Krešo". Krešo has a wife Renata and son Jan and daughter.
Krešo was arrested at the end of episode 78. He was released from prison in episode 128. He decided to stay in Oštrovac.

Tomislav Mamić

Tomislav is Katarina's and Kreša's cousin. His mother is a lawyer. Tomislav is married to Snježana, a local girl whose mother has a pub. They have a baby girl.

Ane Jelaska

Ane is a local alewife. She has a daughter Snježana and a granddaughter. In a local board she is always on Mile's and Stipe's side. She was a president of board for a short time. Her husband is unknown.

Zdenka Gavran

Zdenka is Mile's wife and Damir's mother. She is a housewife. Sveto was in love with her when they been young.

Snježana Mamić

Snježana Mamić, né Jelaska, (portrayed by Jagoda Kumric) is Ane's daughter. She is married to Tomislav and they have a baby girl.

At the beginning of the series she was in love with Damir and hated Katarina, but she withdrew when she realised that he loves Katarina and later she became Katarina's friend. She then begun romantic relationship with Katarina's cousin Tomislav, but her mother was against that relationship. Snježana broke u with him when Katarina told her that Tomislav is with her just for the toilet, but Tomislav and her reconcile later and continue their relationship.

In 145th episode of 1st season she found out that she is pregnant with Tomislav's child and she didn't have courage to tell Ane that. Instead of that she told her that Diana is pregnant, but later is revealed that she is pregnant. Ane threatened Tomislav to marry Snježana, but he didn't want. Later Tomislav himself propose Snježana and marries her.

In season 2 (6th episode) it is revealed that she and Tomislav have a baby. In 23rd episode they gave her name Valentina. In 30th epizose Snježana went to Budapest to study fashion. Later through the season it is revealed that she not study, but works as costume designer on porn movies.

Snježana's best friend is Diana.

Jagoda Kumrić's last full appearance was in 30th episode of 2nd season, but she was removed from credits only after 107th episode of 2nd season.

Diana Tepavac

Diana is best friend of Snježana. She is also wife of Josip. She is a local hairdresser and she has a hairdressing salon. In first season she marries Josip. Her real father is Srećko Brbota.

Milica Mamić

Milica is a lawyer and Tomislav's mother. She is Djura's daughter and Marko's sister. She is fallen women. She framed up Mile for bearhunting, but Marko told the truth and Mile is released. She wanted to kill Marko because of that.

Marko Došen

Marko is Katarina's father. He is the son of Djuro. He is married to Višnja, but in second season she filed papers for divorce. Marko told her not to and they didn't divorce.

Don Mirko Komadina

Mirko was reverend in Oštrovac. He was member of a local board. At the end of first season he was sent to Vatican where he is promoted to vicar.

Višnja Došen

She is Katarina's mother and Marko's wife. Višnja didn't appear in fifth season only. In second season she wanted to file papers for divorce.

Miranda Žeravica

Miranda is Dario's wife. She is very spoiled. She come in Oštrovac with Dario to find missing diamonds. But they stayed in Oštrovac. She and Diana fight in eighth season. She is arrested by inspector Rakić at the end of episode 107 of second season.

Dario Žeravica

Dario came to Oštrovac to find missing diamonds, but he liked Oštrovac so he stayed. Dario has two daughters, the older one Tina and a younger one Sara. He is arrested by inspector Rakić at the end of episode 107 of second season.

Sara Žeravica

Sara is youngest daughter to Dario. She is like granddaughter to Stipe. She likes agronomy. She returned to Zagreb to her grandma.

Tina Žeravica

She is older daughter to Dario. She doesn't like Miranda. During the second season she start a romantic relationship with Mate, but they quickly broke up because she cheated on him with Krešo. Later she broke up with Krešo (Tomislav broke up that instead of Krešo) and she reconciled with Mate. In the will that Stanislav wrote she inherits paintings whose price is 650,000 kunas, but she must marry before her 25th birthday and she can't marry a policeman.

Mate Božić

Mate is new cop in Oštrovac. He came to investigate fire in Sveto's house and stayed in Oštrovac at Stipe's house. He is currently in romantic relationship with Tina.

Don Franjo Olić

Don Franjo is new priest in Oštrovac and official replacement for don Mirko Komadina. Don Franjo came to Oštrovac undercover with bishop Andrija to investigate the Žeravicas and stayed in Oštrovac as new priest. He wanted to go back to Zagreb and requested that from bishop, but bishop died in his new office and he stayed in Oštrovac.

Croatia-related lists
Lists of television characters